Moulting is the manner in which an animal routinely casts off a part of its body (usually an outer layer or covering).

Moult or molt may also refer to:

Biology
Ecdysis, the shedding of the exoskeleton in arthropods and other invertebrates
Exuvia, the old skeleton shed during ecdysis
MOLT-4, a human cancer cell line

People
 Ted Moult (1926–1986), British farmer who became a radio and television personality
 Thomas Moult (1893–1974), English journalist and writer, and one of the Georgian poets

Places
Molt, Montana, United States
Moult, Calvados, France

Fictional characters
Molt, a grasshopper in the 1998 animated film A Bug's Life

See also
Moult-Chicheboville, Calvados, France